St. Michael Academy, a private, sectarian, non-stock Catholic secondary school in Catarman, Northern Samar, Philippines. It is the first and only Catholic learning institution established in the city, owned and operated by the Congregation of the Dominican Sisters of St. Catherine of Siena - Philippines; thus, the only Dominican educational institution found in the Samar - Leyte region operating since 1946.

History
In June 1946, the Prioress General of the Congregation of Dominican Sisters of St. Catherine of Siena, Rev. Mo. Natividad Pilapil, OP, received another invitation from the Bishop of the Diocese of Calbayog, Most Rev. Miguel Acebedo, DD. The request was to open a school in Catarman that would be of great help to the Church's mission of teaching its doctrines and practicing its morals. In answer to the request of the Bishop, the prioress general instructed three Sisters assigned in La Milagrosa Academy in Calbayog, Samar to proceed to Catarman and administer the opening of a new school. Immediately after receiving the orders, Mo. Teresita Hacbang, OP, Sr. Ma Rosa Santiago, OP, Sr. Magdalena Quisay, OP and two working students left for Catarman via Carangian [now San Jose, Northern Samar].

July 1946, a new school was founded. And in appreciation for Bishop Miguel Acebedo, the newly established school was named Saint Michael Academy. To help the Sisters in the opening of the classes, a Board of Directors was created with Atty. Mariano Singzon as president, and benign members Rev. Fr. Potenciano Ortega, the parish priest of Catarman, Don Ignacio Lahorra, Señor Bernabe Figueroa, Señor Francisco Arraiza and Judge Alberto Lim. Some families also lent some tables and chairs to the Sisters. Since there was no existing building yet for the students and for the Sisters, Mrs. Vicenta Balite and Señor Joaquin Cardenas offered part of their houses to be used as classrooms for the incoming students and for the Sisters’ temporary convent for almost two years.

Saint Michael Academy opened on July 7, 1946. The first teaching staff was composed of Mo. Teresita, OP as head of the school, Sr. Ma Rosa, OP, Sr. Magdalena, OP and four lay BSE instructors. During the summer of 1948, SMA successfully produced 17 pioneer graduates in high school.

In 1948, a parcel of land near the church was leased by the Bishop to the Congregation where the existing location of the school is situated up to this day. And the school decided to open college with courses: Associate in Arts and Elementary Teacher's Certificate and elementary level; thus, changing the institution's name to St. Michael Junior College.

1950s
In April 1952, SMJC produced its 21 pioneer graduates in elementary together with the 26 graduates in college, awarded with the degree in Elementary Teacher's Certificate. Unfortunately, it was also in this era that the school decided to phase out the college department due to dearth of resources and manpower. In 1957, 2 wooden structures were constructed: the Sisters’ Convent and a 2 floor school building adjacent to the church.

1960s
In the 1960s, the original name of the school was again used, Saint Michael Academy. SMA officially earned its name as one of the most prestigious Catholic institutions in Samar Island. At this time, SMA started to win awards and receive recognitions.

1970s
During this period the elementary level was decided to be discontinued due to small number of enrollees. In total, the SMA elementary department produced 314 graduates since its opening in the school year 1951–1952. By this time SMA became an exclusive high school which has an increasing enrolment. Also, SMA became popular for sports particularly in basketball in this period.

1980s
SMA became part of the Diocese of Catarman's history when it celebrated its 10th anniversary as a Diocese by staging a show in 1985.

As the new government was installed, a new 2 floor building was proposed by Sr. Patricia Aguilar, OP, and during the late 1980s the new building was inaugurated, now the St. Dominic Building.

1990s
In the 1990s, enrolment rose dramatically. The school's population reached a thousand which resulted to insufficient classrooms and other school facilities. As a result, another 2-storey building was constructed, now the St. Catherine Building, through the effort of Sr. Florencia Cabañog, OP. It houses some of the Administrative Offices, the Faculty Room, the Science Laboratory, the Learning Resource Center, the Computer Laboratory, the School Clinic and the Guidance Office. There were many scholarships offered then, from the government, alumni, private persons and agencies. But in the late 1990s, the enrolment gradually decreased again because of free education in public schools.

On February 27, 1994, SMA Alumni Foundation, Inc was officially founded that grants scholarship for the children of the needy alumni among others.

Due to the implementation of K+12 policy of the Department of Education as a reform in our national educational system starting school year 2012–2013, the need for the construction of another building, now the Mother Francisca Building, to house additional classrooms, the bookstore and supplies store and the transfer of the canteen has been initiated through the untiring leadership of Sr. Meriza Ocampo, OP.

Presently, the school has a total enrolment of more than 750 students. It has 2 two-floor buildings, a new three-floor building, a bigger multi-purpose hall, a student lounge, a Computer Laboratory with 50 units of computer, an enhanced library and a Chapel among others.

Many innovations in the School's curriculum were also implemented since its foundation. The latest innovations of the school are the integration of Computer-aided Instruction with Internet access in all subject areas from first year to fourth year and the adoption of the revised Basic Education Curriculum with Religion as the core subject being a Catholic and a Dominican – Siena School.

The school had also undergone Congregational Evaluation Visit 1 in February 1995 and Congregational Evaluation Visit 2 in February 2000. These series of evaluation visits are in preparation for the school to be a PAASCU Accredited School in the near future. During the school year 2003-2004 under Sr. Trinidad Garcia, OP, the SMA was rated ABOVE STANDARD and was recognized as ONE of the EXCELLENT SCHOOLS in Region VIII by the ESC Certifying Team sent by the DepEd and FAPE Regional Offices. Last November 2008, a re-assessment was concluded by the same offices and once again, the school was rated as an ABOVE STANDARD school.

References

External links
 
 Congregation of Dominican Sisters of St. Catherine of Siena - Philippines
 St. Michael Academy
 St. Michael Academy Alumni Association

Schools in Northern Samar
Dominican educational institutions in the Philippines
Educational institutions established in 1946
Catholic elementary schools in the Philippines
Catholic secondary schools in the Philippines
1946 establishments in the Philippines